Yamal-601 is a Russian geostationary communications satellite ordered by Gazprom Space Systems from Thales Alenia Space (TAS) on the Spacebus-4000C4 satellite bus for its Yamal programme. Its payload was also supplied by Thales Alenia Space and is composed of 38 C-band and 32 Ka-band transponders. It replaced Yamal-202 on 49° East as Yamal-202 was slated to reach its end of service around 2019.

History 
In 2013, Gazprom Space Systems Board decided on a new plan. It required two new spacecraft: Yamal-501 and Yamal-601. In January 2014, Gazprom and Thales announced a contract for a new spacecraft, Yamal-601. In 2015, the Yamal-401 history would repeat itself, and the contract of Yamal-601 with Thales was cancelled and was reassigned to ISS Reshetnev, but Thales was again allowed to keep the payload supply. However, in 2016, this decision to give the spacecraft bus development contract to ISS Reshetnev was reversed, and Thales Alenia Space ended up developing and building the whole satellite, bus and payload.

Launch 
The satellite was launched on 30 May 2019, at 17:42:00 UTC. On 24 June 2019, the satellite was inserted into nominal geostationary orbit.

Mission 
The satellite is intended for the replacement of the Yamal-202 satellite and business development in the Ka-band. On 19 July 2019, the satellite was finally put into operation, transferring all the networks from the Yamal-202 satellite to it.

See also 

 Yamal – communication satellite family operated by Gazprom Space Systems
 Gazprom Space Systems – satellite communication division of the Russian oil giant Gazprom

References

External links 
 Gazprom Space Syatems Yamal-601

Yamal-601
Satellites using the Ekspress bus
Spacecraft launched in 2019
2019 in Russia
Spacecraft launched by Proton rockets